Shelton is a city in, and the county seat of, Mason County, Washington, United States. Shelton is the westernmost city on Puget Sound. The population was 10,371 at the 2020 census. Shelton has a council–manager form of government and was the last city in Washington to use a mayor–commission form of government.

History
Shelton was officially incorporated in 1890. The city was named after David Shelton, a delegate to the territorial legislature. The land was previously called "Cota" and was inhabited and managed by the Squaxin Island Tribe, or "People of the Waters", who had inhabited the land for centuries before contact with white settlers. The land was ceded, along with 4,000 sq. miles of Indigenous land, on December 26, 1854, with the passage of the Treaty of Medicine Creek. After the passage of the treaty, David Shelton and his wife, Frances Shelton, each took a claim of land enabled by the Donation Land Claim Act totaling 640 acres in what would eventually be incorporated as Shelton.

Shelton was once served by a small fleet of steamboats which was part of the Puget Sound Mosquito Fleet. These boats included the Old Settler, Irene, Willie, City of Shelton, Marian, Clara Brown, and S.G. Simpson. The economy was built around logging, farming, dairying and ranching as well as oyster cultivation. The Simpson Timber Company mill on Puget Sound's Oakland Bay dominated the landscape of the downtown area; the mill was sold to Sierra Pacific Industries in 2015, who are currently building a new mill. Shelton also identifies itself as the "Christmas Tree Capital".

Shelton was incorporated in the 1890s. It was the last city in Washington to use a mayor/commission form of government. In November 2017, the voters of Shelton adopted a manager/council form of municipal governance.

Geography

Climate
With extremely precipitous rainfall in winter and dry summer of less than 33 mm in the driest month (less than 1/3 of the rainy season), Shelton has a warm summer Mediterranean climate (Köppen: Csb) with cold winters, similar to the larger cities of the Pacific Northwest.

Demographics

2020 census 
As of the census of 2020, there were 10,371 people, 3,416 households, and 2,055 families residing in the city. The racial makeup of the city was 75.6% White, 0.9% African American, 5% Native American, 1.2% Asian, 0.4% Pacific Islander, 13.9% from other races, and 12% from two or more races. Hispanic or Latino of any race were 25.1% of the population.

There were 3,416 households, of which 28.4% had children under the age of 18 living with them, 32.8% were married couples living together, 18.8% had a female householder with no husband present, 8.6% had a male householder with no wife present, and 39.8% were non-families. 29.2% of all households were made up of individuals, and 16.2% had someone living alone who was 65 years of age or older. The average household size was 2.95 and the average family size was 3.73.

The median age in the city was 32.4 years. 28.4% of residents were under the age of 18; 11.4% were between the ages of 18 and 24; 27.1% were from 25 to 44; 18.6% were from 45 to 64; and 14.5% were 65 years of age or older. The gender makeup of the city was 49.5% male and 50.5% female.

2010 census 
As of the census of 2010, there were 9,834 people, 3,574 households, and 2,166 families residing in the city. The racial makeup of the city was 78.9% White, 0.8% African American, 3.7% Native American, 1.1% Asian, 0.8% Pacific Islander, 9.9% from other races, and 4.9% from two or more races. Hispanic or Latino of any race were 19.2% of the population.

There were 3,574 households, of which 35.3% had children under the age of 18 living with them, 38.1% were married couples living together, 15.5% had a female householder with no husband present, 6.9% had a male householder with no wife present, and 39.4% were non-families. 31.2% of all households were made up of individuals, and 15.6% had someone living alone who was 65 years of age or older. The average household size was 2.63 and the average family size was 3.23.

The median age in the city was 33.1 years. 26.4% of residents were under the age of 18; 10.8% were between the ages of 18 and 24; 26.5% were from 25 to 44; 21.9% were from 45 to 64; and 14.3% were 65 years of age or older. The gender makeup of the city was 49.1% male and 50.9% female.

2000 census
As of the 2000 census, there were 8,442 people, 3,191 households, and 2,035 families residing in the city. The population density was 1,519.4 people per square mile (586.2/km2). There were 3,403 housing units at an average density of 612.5 per square mile (236.3/km2). The racial makeup of the city was 85.83% White, 0.36% African American, 2.72% Native American, 1.17% Asian, 0.73% Pacific Islander, 5.77% from other races, and 3.41% from two or more races. Hispanic or Latino of any race were 10.87% of the population.

There were 3,191 households, out of which 32.3% had children under the age of 18 living with them, 44.8% were married couples living together, 13.0% had a female householder with no husband present, and 36.2% were non-families. 29.5% of all households were made up of individuals, and 15.5% had someone living alone who was 65 years of age or older. The average household size was 2.52 and the average family size was 3.08.

In the city, the population was spread out, with 26.7% under the age of 18, 10.0% from 18 to 24, 26.2% from 25 to 44, 19.4% from 45 to 64, and 17.7% who were 65 years of age or older. The median age was 36 years. For every 100 females, there were 94.4 males. For every 100 females age 18 and over, there were 89.5 males.

The median income for a household in the city was $32,500, and the median income for a family was $40,392. Males had a median income of $33,867 versus $23,617 for females. The per capita income for the city was $16,303. About 15.3% of families and 18.9% of the population were below the poverty line, including 28.1% of those under age 18 and 6.9% of those age 65 or over.

Education
The Shelton School District is composed of eight schools:
 Evergreen, Mountain View, and Bordeaux Elementary Schools, kindergarten through fourth grade
 Olympic Middle School, fifth and sixth grades
 Oakland Bay Junior High, seventh and eighth grades
 Shelton High School, ninth through twelfth grades
 CHOICE Alternative School, seventh through twelfth grade
 Cedar High School, a New Tech Network Project-Based Learning high school for grades ninth through twelfth

Notable people

Raul Allegre - former NFL kicker
 Justin Ena – former NFL linebacker
 Karol Kennedy – 5-time national champion and 1952 Winter Olympics silver medalist who competed in the 1948 and 1952 Olympics in pairs figure skating
 Desmond "Des" Dalworth Koch – 1956 Olympic bronze medalist, discus
Mary Miranda Knight – pioneer and educator
 Jerry Lambert – film and television actor
Arthur Needham – member of the first city council and the first haberdasher in the county
 Lawson H. M. Sanderson – Marine Corps aviation pioneer with the rank of major general
Caleb Schlauderaff – NFL offensive lineman
Paul Stamets – Mushroom enthusiast

References

External links

 City website
 City of Shelton circa 1925 (University of Washington collection)

 
Cities in Washington (state)
Cities in Mason County, Washington
County seats in Washington (state)
Populated places established in 1889
Micropolitan areas of Washington (state)